This is a list of media in Kelowna, British Columbia.

Radio

Television
Kelowna is not designated as a mandatory market for digital television conversion. All broadcasting stations broadcast only in analogue.

See Digital television in Canada for information relating to the transition to HDTV in Canada.

Print

 The Daily Courier: daily newspaper 
 Kelowna Capital News: free community newspaper, published once weekly

References

Kelowna
 
Media, Kelowna
Okanagan-related lists